Kha b-Nisan, Ha b-Nisin, or Ha b-Nison ("First of April"), also known as Resha d-Sheta ("Head of the year") and as Akitu (ܐܟܝܬܘ), or Assyrian New Year, is the spring festival among the indigenous Assyrians of northern Iraq, northeastern Syria, southeastern Turkey and northwestern Iran, celebrated on the first day of April.

The festival has its roots in the ancient Mesopotamian religion and its festival of Akitu, which were practiced by Assyrians until the faith's gradual demise in the face of Syriac Christianity between the 1st and 4th centuries AD. Today, Assyrians are predominantly Christian, with most being adherents of the Assyrian Church of the East, Chaldean Catholic Church, Syriac Orthodox Church, Syriac Catholic Church, Ancient Church of the East, Assyrian Pentecostal Church and Assyrian Evangelical Church. Some ethnic Assyrians self-identify as Chaldeans or Syriacs, depending on church denomination.

Celebrations involve parades and parties. Some Assyrians wear traditional costumes and dance for hours. Celebrations take place throughout Assyria and other areas in the Middle East, along with some in the United States, Europe, Australia, Canada and the Caucasus among Assyrian diaspora communities. There are often parties with food, music and dancing.

History

In the Julian calendar, the vernal equinox moved gradually away from 21 March. The Gregorian calendar reform restored the vernal equinox to its original date, but since the festival was by now tied to the date, not the astronomical event, Kha b-Nisan remains fixed at 21 March in the Julian reckoning, corresponding to 1 April in the Gregorian calendar. The Vernal equinox is celebrated throughout Greater Iran as Noruz (meaning "New Day") on 21 March. However, in the ancient Assyrian, Akkadian and Babylonian traditions, the spring festival was celebrated in the first days of the month known as "Nisan" and the calendar adopted by the ancient Assyrians had the month "Nisan" at the beginning of the calendar lending to the term "Kha b-Nisan", or the "first of Nisan".

The modern observance of Akitu began in the 1960s during the Assyrian intellectual renaissance. Due to political oppression, however, the celebrations were largely private until the 1990s. 

The event is largely celebrated by Assyrians residing in Syria. Although the Syrian government does not acknowledge the festival, Assyrians still continue with the celebration.  In 2002, Assyrians in Syria celebrated the event with a mass wedding of 16 couples and over 25,000 attendees. After the formation of Turkey, Kha b-Nisan along with Nowruz were banned from public celebration. Assyrians in Turkey were first allowed to publicly celebrate Kha b-Nisan in 2005, after organizers received permission from the government to stage the event, in light of democratic reforms adopted in support of Turkey's EU membership bid. Around 5,000 people "including large groups of visiting ethnic Assyrians from Europe, Syria and Iraq" took part in the Kha b-Nisan celebrations.

One of the largest Assyrian New Year celebrations took place in Iraq in 2008. Public celebrations were not allowed by Saddam Hussein's regime prior to the start of the Iraq war. The event was organized by the Assyrian Democratic Movement (Zowaa) and between 45,000 to 65,000 people took part in the parade.

In 2004, Hon. George Radanovich of the California State Assembly recognized the Assyrian New Year and extended his wishes to the Assyrian community in California. This was later followed by a letter from the California governor, Arnold Schwarzenegger, to the Assyrian community in California, congratulating them on the annual celebration.

In 2020 festivities were cancelled in northeastern Syria due to the COVID-19 pandemic.

Celebration
Assyrians celebrate Kha b-Nisan by holding social events including parades and parties. They also gather in clubs and social institutions and listen to the poets who recite the story of creation. Those celebrating wear traditional clothes and poppies. Some people will dress up as ancient Assyrian royalty. People greet each other by saying Reesh Shato Brikhto, Reesha D’Sheeta Brikhta or Akitu Breekha. 

Due to its modern alignment with April Fool's Day, the festival is often more lighthearted than its historical counterpart.

It is a tradition in Assyrian villages for girls to gather flowers and herbs which are then suspended under the house's roof or made into a garland for a home's front door. The bunches are referred to as "Deqna d-Nisan", meaning "the beard of April/Spring".

Newer traditions have also arisen in diaspora communities. The Assyrian community in Yonkers, New York has a tradition of raising the Assyrian flag in front of City Hall on April 1. In Chicago, Illinois, it has also become tradition to hold a parade down King Sargon Boulevard.

Image gallery

See also
 Assyria
 Akitu
 Nowruz
 Seharane
 Sham el-Nessim

References

Sources

External links
 Akitu and Newruz (aina.org)
 Kurd's – Persian New Year; its Assyrian – Babylonian origin  (christiansofiraq.com)
 Assyrian NewYear 6758 Ceremony In Tehran (brasheet.com)
 Assyrian NewYear 6758 Ceremony In Urmia (brasheet.com)

Assyrian culture
Spring festivals
New Year celebrations
Nisan
April observances
Festivals in Iraq
Festivals in Syria
Festivals in Iran
Festivals in Turkey
Festivals in Russia
Spring (season) events in Iran